The Special Tony Award category includes the Lifetime Achievement Tony Award and the Special Tony Award. These are non-competitive honorary awards, and the titles have changed over the years. The Tony Award for Lifetime Achievement in the Theatre is to "honor an individual for the body of his or her work." (The Tony Award for Best Special Theatrical Event was a competitive award, given from 2001 to 2009.) Another non-competitive Tony award is the Tony Honors for Excellence in Theatre, to "recognize the achievements of individuals and organizations that do not fit into any of the competitive categories."

Award winners

1940s

1950s

1960s

1970s

1980s

1990s

2000s

2010s

2020s

See also
 Regional Theatre Tony Award
 Tony Honors for Excellence in Theatre

References

External links
Tony Awards Official site
Tony Awards at Internet Broadway database Listing
Tony Awards at broadwayworld.com

Tony Awards
Lifetime achievement awards
Awards established in 1947
1947 establishments in the United States
Special Tony Award recipients